Persatuan Sepakbola Indonesia Kota Depok 1999 (simply known as Persikad 1999) is an Indonesian football club based in Depok, West Java. They currently compete in the Liga 3.

History
Persikad 1999 FC is not the same club as Persikad Depok, but was officially founded on 27 April 2018. The founders of Persikad 1999 club are practitioners from various backgrounds, such as educators, sports observers, legal and sports practitioners.

The Persikad 1999 was formed based on an agreement with the founders of the Persikad 1999 association. The license to compete in PSSI's official competition was obtained after acquiring another West Java club, namely Mars Gelatik and officially established through the PSSI West Java Congress in February 2020. After the 2019 Liga 3 West Java Series 2 season ended.

References

External links

Depok
Sport in West Java
Football clubs in Indonesia
Football clubs in West Java
Association football clubs established in 2018
2018 establishments in Indonesia
Phoenix clubs (association football)